Robert Parker  (9 January 1847 – 20 February 1937) was a New Zealand organist, choirmaster and conductor.

Early life 
Parker was born in London, England, in 1847. He received his music education, studying violin, piano and organ, from the organist George Cooper, as a chorister at St Pauls Cathedral and at the London Academy of Music and Queen's College, Cambridge.

Career 
Parker emigrated to Christchurch in 1869 becoming organist and choirmaster at the Church of St John the Baptist . In 1878 he moved first to Nelson and then to Wellington where he became organist and choirmaster at St Paul's Cathedral.

In Wellington he became active in a range of musical activities. He was conductor of the Wellington Orchestral Society, the Wellington Choral Society, Wellington Musical Union, and the Wellington Liedertafel. He lectured at the Wellington Teachers College, examined music for the Department of Education and University of New Zealand and chaired the Music Teachers' Association of New Zealand and the Music Teachers' Registration Board.

In 1888 he began New Zealand Music Festivals encouraging composers such as Alfred Hill and Maughan Barnett.

The writer Katherine Mansfield based the character of the piano teacher Mr Bullen in her short story The Wind Blows on Parker.

Parker laid the foundations of choral and orchestra music in New Zealand in the 19th century.

Honours and awards 
He was appointed a Companion of the Order of St Michael and St George in the 1930 New Year Honours as "a leading member of the musical profession in the Dominion of New Zealand".

Personal life 
Parker married Emma Martin in 1871 and they had four sons and three daughters.

He died in Wellington on 20 February 1937.

References

Further reading 

 Moriarty, J. (1961) Wellington's music to 1890 : An attempted bibliography , with lists of significant advertisements from early newspapers and an appendix of programmes from 1878 to 1890, mainly of musical activities conducted by Mr. Robert Parker.

1847 births
1937 deaths
New Zealand classical organists
Male classical organists
19th-century New Zealand male singers
New Zealand conductors (music)
Male conductors (music)
New Zealand Companions of the Order of St Michael and St George
Musicians from London
English emigrants to New Zealand